The 1991 Currie Cup Central / Rural Series was a rugby union competition held between the teams in the 1991 Currie Cup Central B and 1991 Currie Cup Rural C competitions, the third and fourth tiers of the premier domestic competition in South Africa. This formed part of the 53rd Currie Cup season since the competition started in 1889.

Teams

Competition

There were ten participating teams in the 1991 Currie Cup Central / Rural Series, the six teams from the 1991 Currie Cup Central B competition and the four teams from the 1991 Currie Cup Rural C competition. These teams played the teams from the other league once over the course of the season, either at home or away. Teams received two points for a win and one points for a draw.

Log

Fixtures and results

Round one

Round two

Round three

Round four

Round five

Round six

Round seven

Round eight

Round nine

Round ten

Round eleven

See also
 1991 Currie Cup
 1991 Currie Cup / Central Series
 1991 Currie Cup Central A
 1991 Currie Cup Central B
 1991 Currie Cup Rural C
 1991 Currie Cup Rural D
 1991 Lion Cup

References

Central Rural Series